Copper hydride  is inorganic compound with the chemical formula CuHn where n ~ 0.95. It is a red solid, rarely isolated as a pure composition, that decomposes to the elements. Copper hydride is mainly produced as a reducing agent in organic synthesis and as a precursor to various catalysts.

History 

In 1844, the French chemist Adolphe Wurtz synthesised copper hydride for the first time. He reduced an aqueous solution of copper(II) sulfate with hypophosphorous acid (H3PO2). In 2011, Panitat Hasin and Yiying Wu were the first to synthesise a metal hydride (copper hydride) using the technique of sonication. Copper hydride has the distinction of being the first metal hydride discovered. In 2013, it was established by Donnerer et al. that, at least up to fifty gigapascals, copper hydride cannot be synthesised by pressure alone. However, they were successful in synthesising several copper-hydrogen alloys under pressure.

Chemical properties

Structure 

In copper hydride, elements adopt the Wurtzite crystal structure (polymeric), being connected by covalent bonds.

The CuH consists of a core of CuH with a shell of water and this may be largely replaced by ethanol. This offers the possibility of modifying the properties of CuH produced by aqueous routes. While all methods for the synthesis of CuH result in the same bulk product, the synthetic path taken engenders differing surface properties. The different behaviors of CuH obtained by aqueous and nonaqueous routes can be ascribed to a combination of very different particle size and dissimilar surface termination, namely, bonded hydroxyls for the aqueous routes and a coordinated donor for the nonaqueous routes.

Chemical reactions 

CuH generally behaves as a source of H–.  For instance, Wurtz reported the double displacement reaction of CuH with hydrochloric acid:

CuH + HCl → CuCl +

When not cooled below , copper hydride decomposes, to produce hydrogen gas and a mixture containing elemental copper:
2 CuH → xCu•(2-x)CuH + ½x  (0 < x < 2)

Solid copper hydride is the irreversible autopolymerisation product of the molecular form, and the molecular form cannot be isolated in concentration.

Production 

Copper does not react with hydrogen even on heating, thus copper hydrides are made indirectly from copper(I) and copper(II) precursors. Examples include the reduction of copper(II) sulfate with sodium hypophosphite in the presence of sulfuric acid, or more simply with just hypophosphorous acid. Other reducing agents, including classical aluminium hydrides can be used.

4 Cu2+ + 6 H3PO2 + 6 H2O → 4 CuH + 6 H3PO3 + 8 H+

The reactions produce a red-colored precipitate of CuH, which is generally impure and slowly decomposes to liberate hydrogen, even at 0 °C.
2 CuH → 2 Cu + H2

This slow decomposition also takes place underwater, however there are reports of the material becoming pyrophoric if dried.

A new synthesis method has been published in 2017 by Lousada et al. In this synthesis high purity CuH nanoparticles have been obtained from basic copper carbonate, CuCO3·Cu(OH)2. This method is faster and has a higher chemical yield than the copper sulfate based synthesis and produces nanoparticles of CuH with higher purity and a smaller size distribution. The obtained CuH can easily be converted to conducting thin films of Cu. These films are obtained by spraying the CuH nanoparticles in their synthesis medium into some insulating support. After drying, conducting Cu films protected by a layer of mixed copper oxides are spontaneously formed.

Reductive sonication 

Copper hydride is also produced by reductive sonication. In this process, hexaaquacopper(II) and hydrogen(•) react to produce copper hydride and oxonium according to the equation:
[Cu(H2O)6]2+ + 3 H• → 1/n (CuH)n + 2 [H3O]+ + 4 H2O
Hydrogen(•) is obtained in situ from the homolytic sonication of water. Reductive sonication produces molecular copper hydride as an intermediate.

Applications in Organic Synthesis 

Phosphine- and NHC-copper hydride species have been developed as reagents in organic synthesis, albeit of limited use.  Most widely used is [(Ph3P)CuH]6 (Stryker's reagent) for the reduction of α,β-unsaturated carbonyl compounds. H2 (at least 80 psi) and hydrosilanes can be used as the terminal reductant, allowing a catalytic amount of [(Ph3P)CuH]6 to be used for conjugate reduction reactions.

Chiral phosphine-copper complexes catalyze hydrosilation of ketones and esters with low enanotioselectivities. An enantioselective (80 to 92% ee) reduction of prochiral α,β-unsaturated esters uses Tol-BINAP complexes of copper in the presence of PMHS as the reductant. Subsequently,  conditions have been developed for the CuH-catalyzed hydrosilylation of ketones and imines proceeding with excellent levels of chemo- and enantioselectivity.

The reactivity of LnCuH species with weakly activated (e.g. styrenes, dienes) and unactivated alkenes (e.g. α-olefins) and alkynes has been recognized and has served as the basis for several copper-catalyzed formal hydrofunctionalization reactions.

"Hydridocopper" 
The diatomic species CuH is a gas that has attracted the attention of spectroscopists.  It polymerises upon being condensed. A well-known oligomer is octahedro-hexacuprane(6), occurring in Stryker's reagent. Hydridocopper has acidic behavior for the same reason as normal copper hydride. However, it does not form stable aqueous solutions, due in part to its autopolymerisation, and its tendency to be oxidised by water. Copper hydride reversibly precipitates from pyridine solution, as an amorphous solid. However, repeated dissolution affords the regular crystalline form, which is insoluble. Under standard conditions, molecular copper hydride autopolymerises to form the crystalline form, including under aqueous conditions, hence the aqueous production method devised by Wurtz.

Production 
Molecular copper hydride can be formed by reducing copper iodide with lithium aluminium hydride in ether and pyridine. 4CuI + LiAlH4 → CuH + LiI + AlI3 This was discovered by E Wiberg and W Henle in 1952. The solution of this CuH in the pyridine is typically dark red to dark orange. A precipitate is formed if ether is added to this solution. This will redissolve in pyridine. Impurities of the reaction products remain in the product. In this study, it was found that the solidified diatomic substance is distinct from the Wurtzite structure. The Wurtzite substance was insoluble and was decomposed by lithium iodide, but not the solidified diatomic species. Moreover, while the Wurtzite substance's decomposition is strongly base catalysed, whereas the solidified diatomic species is not strongly affected at all. Dilts distinguishes between the two copper hydrides as the 'insoluble-' and 'soluble copper hydrides'. The soluble hydride is susceptible to pyrolysis under vacuum and proceeds to completion under 100 °C.

Amorphous copper hydride is also produced by anhydrous reduction. In this process copper(I) and tetrahydroaluminate react to produce molecular copper hydride and triiodoaluminium adducts. The molecular copper hydride is precipitated into amorphous copper hydride with the addition of diethyl ether. Amorphous copper hydride is converted into the Wurtz phase by annealing, accompanied by some decomposition.

History 

Hydridocopper was discovered in the vibration-rotation emission of a hollow-cathode lamp in 2000 by Bernath, who detected it at the University of Waterloo. It was first detected as a contaminant while attempting to generate NeH+ using the hollow-cathode lamp. Molecular copper hydride has the distinction of being the first metal hydride to be detected in this way. (1,0) (2,0) and (2,1) vibrational bands were observed along with line splitting due to the presence of two copper isotopes, 63Cu and 65Cu.

The A1Σ+-X1Σ+ absorption lines from CuH have been claimed to have been observed in sunspots and in the star 19 Piscium.

In vapour experiments, it was found that copper hydride is produced from the elements upon exposure to 310 nanometre radiation.
Cu + H2 ↔ CuH + H•
However, this proved to be unviable as a production method as the reaction is difficult to control. The activation barrier for the reverse reaction is virtually non-existent, which allows it to readily proceed even at 20 Kelvin.

Other copper hydrides 

 A binary dihydride also exists, in the form of an unstable reactive intermediate in the reduction of copper hydride by atomic hydrogen.

References 

Copper(I) compounds
Metal hydrides
Wurtzite structure type